"Let Me Be the One" is a song written in 1970 by Roger Nichols and Paul Williams. It was first recorded by Nanette Workman and released in 1970 as a single on Columbia Records. The Carpenters' version first appeared on their 1971 album Carpenters.

Background
"Let Me Be the One" is a relatively short song, with a run time of 2:25. The earliest evident recording of "Let Me Be the One" was by Nanette Workman being one of five songs recorded with producer Tommy Cogbill recorded in late June 1970 at American Sound Studio in Memphis, with "Let Me Be the One" being afforded a UK single release in November 1970 with the singer credited mononymously as Nanette.

Bearing something of a resemblance to "We've Only Just Begun", the song was a potential Carpenters single release in 1971 being Karen Carpenter's choice to follow "For All We Know", but Richard Carpenter doubted the hit potential of "Let Me Be the One" and the choice for single was assigned to "Rainy Days and Mondays". However the album cut "Let Me Be the One" did receive airplay on both Top 40 and MOR radio stations. Paul Williams has described "Let Me Be the One" as "one of those songs that everybody's recorded but it's never been a [major hit] single. It was used very briefly by ABC-TV in 1976 and Channel 9 Australia in 1977: Let us be the one you turn to/ Let us be the one you turn to/ When you need someone you turn to/ Let us be the one."

The 1991 remix for "Let Me Be the One" can only be found on the From the Top box set, for which it was released as a promotional single. It starts off with Karen counting off, and Richard's piano line is very different from the original 1971 mix found on the Carpenters album. In the original 1971 mix, the song fades out; the 1991 remix continues through to the point where Karen and the rest of the musicians create a conclusion.

Personnel
Karen Carpenter – lead and backing vocals
Richard Carpenter – backing vocals, piano, Wurlitzer electric piano, orchestration
Joe Osborn – bass
Hal Blaine – drums

Other versions
Al Wilson recorded "Let Me Be the One" for his 1974 album La La Peace Song which featured the song in medley form with another Nichols/Williams composition, "I Won't Last a Day Without You"; the track, "I Won't Last a Day Without You"/"Let Me Be the One", was issued as a single in December 1974 and reached No. 18 on the Billboard R&B chart while crossing over to both Billboard'''s Adult Contemporary chart (#39) and the mainstream Pop chart, the Billboard Hot 100 (#70).  Chelsea Brown performed the song in a 1972 episode of The Two Ronnies (original broadcast 30 September 1972).

The song has also been recorded by Petula Clark (album Warm and Tender, 1971), Clodagh Rodgers (album Rodgers and Heart, 1971), Paul Davis (album Paul Davis, 1972), Malcolm Roberts (album Living for Life, 1973), Suzanne Lynch (album Friends with You, 1973, credited to Suzanne [no surname]), the Temprees (album Love Maze, 1973), Vikki Carr (album One Hell of a Woman, 1974), Joy Fleming (album This Is My Life, 1974), Johnny Mathis ("Let Me Be the One/I Won't Last a Day Without You" medley on album When Will I See You Again, 1975), Cleo Laine (album Born on a Friday, 1976), Jack Jones whose version reached No. 18 on the US Easy Listening chart in 1971 (album A Song for You, 1972), Shirley Bassey (album Bassey: The EMI/UA Years 1959-1979, 1994; also And I Love You So expanded edition, 2000), Matthew Sweet (album If I Were a Carpenter, 1994) and Diana Ross (album Last Time I Saw Him'' expanded edition, 2007).

Chart history
Jack Jones

Al Wilson

References

External links
 

1970 songs
1970 singles
1971 singles
The Carpenters songs
Vikki Carr songs
Shirley Bassey songs
Petula Clark songs
Johnny Mathis songs
Diana Ross songs
Al Wilson (singer) songs
1991 singles
Songs written by Paul Williams (songwriter)
Songs written by Roger Nichols (songwriter)
A&M Records singles